The Tren Blindado (Spanish for armoured train) is a national monument, memorial park, and museum of the Cuban Revolution, located in the city of Santa Clara, Cuba. It was created by the Cuban sculptor José Delarra on the site of and in memory of the capture of an armoured train on 29 December 1958, during the Battle of Santa Clara.

Overview
The memorial is located on the Avenica Liberación in the Begonchea ward, just after the depot of Santa Clara station, nearby a level crossing. It lies between the Havana-Camagüey-Santiago rail line and the Cubanicay river. It consists of an open sculpture park, an obelisk dedicated to Che Guevara, and a monument representing the bulldozer used by Guevara and his soldiers to derail the train. The derailed cars are used as the rooms of the museum.

Historical events

The capture of the train followed the conquest of the whole of Santa Clara. Due to this final victory, the city is still called the "city of the heroic guerrillas". After Fidel Castro captured Santa Clara, Batista wanted to bring about a turning point in the battle and the war. In an attempt to defeat the revolutionaries led by Fidel Castro, he sent an armored train from Havana on 23 December 1958. The large train had two diesel locomotives and seventeen four-axle freight cars and U.S.-made personnel carriers. The train carried 373 armed soldiers, ammunition, and provisions for two months.

The next day it reached Santa Clara and stopped at the foot of the Loma del Capiro hill. Three days later eighteen guerrillas under the command of Ernesto "Che" Guevara attacked the train. When the officers tried to move the train to a better position, Guevara derailed the train by bulldozing 30 meters of track. After several hours of fierce combat, the guerrillas captured the weapons and ammunition. The officers finally surrendered in the evening. Many of the rebels befriended and fraternized with the soldiers they had been fighting only hours before.

Gallery

Media
The events surrounding the Tren Blindado have been depicted in at least two major-studio films:
Cuba, a 1979 US drama film directed by Richard Lester and starring Sean Connery.
Che (Part 1: The Argentine), a 2008 US/French/Spanish drama film directed by Steven Soderbergh and starring Benicio del Toro.

References

External links

Monuments and memorials in Cuba
Buildings and structures in Santa Clara, Cuba
Cuban Revolution
Che Guevara
Railway museums in Cuba
Museums in Cuba
Armoured trains of Cuba
Tourist attractions in Santa Clara, Cuba